General elections were held in Malta on 14 January 1904. Following the elections, all elected members immediately resigned in protest against the 1903 "Chamberlain" Constitution, forcing fresh elections to be held in February.

Background
The elections were the first held under the Chamberlain Constitution. The number of members elected from single-member constituencies was reduced from ten to eight.

Results
A total of 7,991 people were registered to vote, but no votes were cast as all candidates were unopposed.

References

General elections in Malta
January 1904 events
Malta
1904 in Malta
Single-candidate elections
Uncontested elections